The emperor rat (Uromys imperator) is a large species of rodent in the family Muridae. It is endemic to the island of Guadalcanal in the Solomon Islands. It is classified as critically endangered by the IUCN but may already be extinct.

References

Uromys
Mammals described in 1888
Rodent extinctions since 1500
Taxonomy articles created by Polbot
Taxa named by Oldfield Thomas